In mathematics, the corona or corona set of a topological space X is the complement βX\X of the space in its Stone–Čech compactification βX.

A topological space is said to be σ-compact if it is the union of countably many compact subspaces, and locally compact if every point has a neighbourhood with compact closure. The corona of a σ-compact and locally compact Hausdorff space is a sub-Stonean space, i.e., any two open σ-compact disjoint subsets have disjoint compact closures.

See also

Corona theorem
Corona algebra, a non-commutative analogue of the corona set.

References

Topology